Motorway 11 (A11) is a branch of the Motorway 1 in Greece, connecting it with the city of Chalcis. It starts at Schimatari and ends at Evripos Bridge at the city of Chalcis.

Exit list

The exits of the A11 motorway:

References

11
Roads in Central Greece